Commemorative plaques in Merseyside, England, can be found across the region, highlighting notable people, buildings or historic sites. Many of the plaques are issued by authoritative bodies such as a council or a historical society that has a special interest.

English Heritage 
In the year 2000, London's blue plaque scheme was expanded to locations outside of the capital. In Liverpool, 14 English Heritage plaques were erected before the short-lived scheme ended.

Liverpool City Council 
Prior to 2005, a multitude of commemorative plaque of different colours could be found across Liverpool. Since then, some of these plaques have been replaced by Liverpool City Council with new black faced and stone-rimmed ones. Over 100 black plaques have been installed.

The Wavertree Society 
Centred around Wavertree, Liverpool, local conservation group The Wavertree Society aims to preserve the area's architectural heritage and has issued its on series of green plaques. Its first three plaque were installed on 9 March 2012 and commemorated the Lock-up, the Monk's Well and Picton Clock Tower. The plaques themselves are manufactured by local firm Photocast Products Ltd, located in nearby Speke.

References

 
Merseyside-related lists
Cultural heritage of England
Cultural history of the United Kingdom